Ranko Mamuzić (born January 30, 1998) is a Macedonian professional basketball Small forward who currently plays for Strumica in the Macedonian First League.

References

External links
 Eurobasket Profile
 FIBA Profile
 BGBasket Profile
 ABA League Profile

1998 births
Sportspeople from Kavadarci
Macedonian expatriate basketball people in Spain
Macedonian men's basketball players
Living people
Forwards (basketball)
Macedonian people of Serbian descent
CB Lucentum Alicante players
KK MZT Skopje players